The 1999 AFL Ansett Australia Cup was the Australian Football League Pre-season Cup competition played in its entirety before the Australian Football League's 1999 Premiership Season began. It culminated the final in March 1999.

Games

Round of 16

|- bgcolor="#CCCCFF"
| Home team
| Home team score
| Away team
| Away team score
| Ground
| Crowd
| Date
| Time
|- bgcolor="#FFFFFF"
| 
| 7.8 (50) 
| 
| 14.12 (96)
| Subiaco Oval 
| 12,088
| Thursday 11 February 1999
| 6:00 PM
|- bgcolor="#FFFFFF"
| 
| 12.15 (87)
| 
| 4.4 (28)
| The Gabba
| 16,318
| Friday, 12 February 1999
| 7:00 PM
|- bgcolor="#FFFFFF"
| 
| 12.13 (85)
| 
| 11.8 (74)
| Manuka Oval
| 13,313
| Saturday, 13 February 1999
| 5:00 PM
|- bgcolor="#FFFFFF"
| 
| 14.8 (92)
| 
| 18.12 (120)
| Marrara Oval
| 14,211
| Saturday, 13 February 1999
| 6:00 PM
|- bgcolor="#FFFFFF"
| 
| 8.15 (63)
| 
| 6.10 (46)
| Waverley Park
| 11,325
| Thursday, 18 February 1999
| 8:00 PM
|- bgcolor="#FFFFFF"
| 
| 8.9 (57)
| 
| 13.15 (93)
| Football Park
| 40,577
| Friday 19 February 1999
| 8:00 PM
|- bgcolor="#FFFFFF"
| 
| 9.7 (61)
| 
| 20.14 (134)
| Waverley Park
| 13,514
| Saturday, 20 February 1999
| 8:00 PM
|- bgcolor="#FFFFFF"
| 
| 9.6 (60)
| 
| 12.9 (81)
| Waverley Park
| 16,321
| Sunday, 21 February 1999
| 8:00 PM

Quarter-finals

|- bgcolor="#CCCCFF"
| Home team
| Home team score
| Away team
| Away team score
| Ground
| Crowd
| Date
| Time
|- bgcolor="#FFFFFF"
| 
| 14.8 (92)
| 
| 10.9 (69)
| Waverley Park
| 12,993
| Monday, 22 February 1999
| 8:00 PM
|- bgcolor="#FFFFFF"
| 
| 4.11 (35)
| 
| 9.9 (63)
| Waverley Park
| 8,948
| Thursday, 25 February 1999
| 8:00 PM
|- bgcolor="#FFFFFF"
| 
| 10.7 (67)
| 
| 16.16 (112)
| Football Park
| 16,935
| Friday, 26 February 1999
| 8:00 PM
|- bgcolor="#FFFFFF"
| 
| 13.8 (86)
| 
| 13.17 (95)
| North Hobart Oval
| 7,815
| Saturday, 27 February 1999
| 2:00 PM

Semi-finals

|- bgcolor="#CCCCFF"
| Home team
| Home team score
| Away team
| Away team score
| Ground
| Crowd
| Date
| Time
|- bgcolor="#FFFFFF"
| 
| 10.11 (71)
| 
| 8.13 (61)
| Waverley Park
| 24,175
| Friday 5 March 1999 
| 8:00 PM
|- bgcolor="#FFFFFF"
| 
| 10.11 (71)
| 
| 7.7 (49)
| Melbourne Cricket Ground
| 16,081
| Saturday, 6 March 1999
| 8:00 PM

Final

|- bgcolor="#CCCCFF"
| Home team
| Home team score
| Away team
| Away team score
| Ground
| Crowd
| Date
| Time
|- bgcolor="#FFFFFF"
| 
| 12.11 (83)
| 
| 5.6 (36)
| Waverley Park
| 49,874
| Saturday March 13, 1999
| 8:05 PM

Final Placings 

1.	Hawthorn 
2.	Port Adelaide 
3.	Western Bulldogs 
4.	St. Kilda 
5.	Kangaroos 
6.	Brisbane 
7.	Richmond 
8.	Sydney 
9.	Collingwood 
10.	Essendon 
11.	Melbourne 
12.	West Coast 
13.	Adelaide 
14.	Fremantle 
15.	Geelong 
16.	Carlton

See also

List of Australian Football League night premiers
1999 AFL season

References

1999 Australian Football League season
Ansett Australia Cup, 1999
Australian Football League pre-season competition